Surmeet Maavi  (born 28 March 1974) is an Indian screenwriter and actor who has scripted many films including Punjab 1984 and Gun & Goal.

Early life
Born to a Punjabi Jatt family in Ropar, Punjab, Surmeet Maavi travelled a lot with his family during his school education. His fascination for advertising prompted him to pursue a master's degree in mass communication from Punjabi University, Patiala. After graduating, he worked for a newspaper printed in Chandigarh; he later realized that he was not meant for journalism. So he left the job and headed to Mumbai. There in congregation of Barry Dhillon, he learned to write for TV; he wrote story and dialogue for serials like Lakeeran, Daane Anaar De and Dupatta, among others. Then he wrote a screenplay for a Hindi serial Kahin To Milegi. Meanwhile, he worked for channels like Balle Balle, ATN MH1 and Channel Punjabi. He worked as a writer for 4–5 years at ATN MH1. After a journey of 15 years, he was hired to write dialogue for the movie Punjab 1984.

Career
When Surmeet Maavi moved to Mumbai in 1999, he worked as an assistant director for the TV serials Partapi and Kaun Dilan Diyan Jane, both aired on Alpha Punjabi.
He was also the chief assistant director for Kamyabi Zindagi Ki, aired on Doordarshan, and an associate director for Daane Anaar De, aired on Zee Punjabi.

His first project was the TV show Lakeeran for ATN Alpha ETC Punjabi, for which he wrote the story, screenplay and dialogues. For Kahin Toh Milenge, which aired on Sahara One, he wrote the dialogues. He also wrote some episodes of reality TV shows Awaaz Punjab Di, The Great Punjabi Comedy Show and Comedy Ka Maha Muqabala, and translated scripts into Punjabi for Big CBS Spark, History TV18 and Discovery Science.

References

External links
 
 Cine Punjabi
 MOVIESTALKIES
 PANDOLIN

1974 births
Living people
21st-century Indian male actors
Indian male film actors
Indian male poets
Indian male screenwriters
Male actors from Madhya Pradesh
Male actors from Punjab, India
Male actors in Punjabi cinema
People from Shahdol district
Punjabi screenwriters
Punjabi University alumni
Screenwriters from Madhya Pradesh
ਸੁਰਮੀਤ ਮਾਵੀ ਬਾਹਰੋ ਇਕ ਆਮ ਇਨਸਾਨ ਪਰ ਉਸਦੇ ਅੰਦਰ ਇਕ ਕ੍ਰਾਂਤੀਕਾਰੀ,ਸੂਝਵਾਨ ਅਤੇ ਵਿਚਾਰਕ ਇਨਸਾਨ ਲੁਕਿਆ ਹੋਇਆ।